Tefé, known in early accounts as Teffé, is a municipality in the state of Amazonas, northern Brazil.

Location

Tefé is located about 525 km by air or 595 km by river to the west of Manaus on the south bank of the Rio Solimões (the upper Amazon), on the lake formed by the mouth of the Tefé River. The nearest large city is Coari, 192 km SE by east of Tefé.

The municipal seat of Tefé is the largest town and commercial center of the middle Solimões region. Its population was 59,547  evenly divided between urban and rural, and its area is 23,704 km². There are no roads into Tefé and the only access is by river boat or plane. By fast boat it is about 12 hours from Manaus. Azul Linhas Aereas and Voepass operate flights from Manaus to Tefé Airport.

The city is the home of the Territorial Prelature of Tefé. Tefé is also the major starting point for trips into the Mamiraua Reserve.

The municipality is in the Juruá-Purus moist forests ecoregion.
It contains 46% of the Tefé National Forest, created in 1989.
The municipality contains 33.85% of the  Catuá-Ipixuna Extractive Reserve, established in 2003 as the first extractive reserve in the state of Amazonas.

History
As early as 1620 the Portuguese Carmelites could already boast of converts among the Muras, those natives of the Amazon established around Lake Teffé and on the borders of the neighbouring rivers.
Tefé, also called Ega at one time, was the fourth of eight aldeias founded by Carmelite missionaries between 1697 and 1751 along the Solimões and Negro Rivers. In 1759 the commandant Joaquim de Mello da Povoas converted the Carmelite 
mission on Lake Tefé into a town, which he named Ega; it was elevated to a city named Tefé in 1855 (but was known as Tefé before that time). The mission, called Parauarí, was originally established on Ilha dos Veados three leagues from the location on the opposite shore of Lake Tefe, called today by the name of Nogueira. It was abandoned due to a smallpox outbreak in the early 18th century and moved across the lake, where it remains today. The survivors were taken to its present site by F. Andre da Costa in 1817.

Henry W. Bates also describes in detail the cultural interactions of the natives with those in the town from his trip in the 1850s. He describes that the natives learned Tupi very quickly, and despite having a very large and diverse array of languages spoken all around the Amazon, Tupi was spoken "with little corruption along the banks of the main Amazons for a distance of 2,500 miles."

In 1910, an apostolic prefecture, the current Prelature of Teffe, was founded by priests of the Congregation of the Holy Spirit.

Climate

References

Bates, Henry Walter (date) Naturalist on the River Amazons

Notes

 
Municipalities in Amazonas (Brazilian state)
Populated places on the Amazon
Road-inaccessible communities of Brazil